Santa Barbara, officially the Municipality of Santa Barbara,  is a 2nd class municipality in the province of Iloilo, Philippines. According to the 2020 census, it has a population of 67,630 people.

Santa Barbara is a part of the Metro Iloilo–Guimaras area, centered on Iloilo City.

Geography
Almost 100% of Santa Barbara's land is cultivated and alienable or disposable.

The topography of Santa Barbara varies from slightly rolling hills to almost flat or gradually inclined plains, sliced by Tigum River at its centremost, which flows from the north-west to the southeast and the Aganan River in the southern section.

Land Use
Basically, Santa Barbara is an agricultural town with 84.75% or  devoted to agriculture. The built-up areas within the poblacion and the barangay areas total  or 8.761%. Also included in this category are the areas utilized for commercial, institutional purposes, parks and open space. Agro-industrial area is 101.928 has. or 1.315%, industrial area is .069 % or 5.330 has., utilities or roads comprise 150.853 has. or 1.946% . The area for the cemeteries is 4.720 has. or .061 % and bodies of water is 1.084% or 84 hectares.

Climate

There is a distinct climate in this municipality, which is ideal for planting of multiple crops. It has a type “C” (moist ) rain sufficiently distributed with almost 4 ½ dry months or first –type climate with two distinct seasons of six months.

This municipality is not within the country's typhoon belt although tropical storms and occasional typhoons pass through it.

Barangays
Santa Barbara is politically subdivided into 60 barangays.

History
The Augustinian Archives, Vol. 17–18, which recorded the missionary achievements of the Augustinian missionaries, mentions that in 1617 the missionaries ministered a community then known as Catmon, a name derived from a fruit tree which was an imposing landmark, which sat on a rich and fertile plain traversed by the Salug (now Tigum) and Aganan rivers, producing rice, corn, sugar, mongo and tobacco. Then Catmon was only a “Visita Catmon” of Jaro vicariate.

In 1760, Catmon was established as an independent parish, whose patron saint was Santa Barbara and the settlement became a “pueblo” named after her. Its total population at the time was 15,094.

In 1845, its population was 19,719 and it covered an area which are now the Municipalities of Maasin, Janiuay, Cabatuan, Alimodian, San Miguel, Zarraga, New Lucena and parts of Leganes and Pavia.

When the Philippine Revolution broke out on Luzon in 1896, it did not spread immediately to Iloilo. The Spanish authorities thought that they could keep the Ilonggos loyal to Spain. Governador–General Basilio Agustin organized the Volunteer Militia in Iloilo to enlist Ilonggos to fight the Tagalog rebels. Being a “mestizo” and having occupied the highest office in his town, Martin Teofilo Delgado was appointed commander of the “voluntaries” in Santa Barbara.

Unknown to the Spaniards, however, Delgado had already become a “revolucionario”. On October 28, 1898, he publicly declared himself for the Revolution and seized the municipal building. The Revolutionary Government of the Visayas was organized and on November 17, 1898, was formally inaugurated at the town plaza of Santa Barbara. A large crowd hailing from many places across Iloilo gathered for the historic occasion. The Philippine flag was raised for the first time outside of Luzon.

The officials of the Revolutionary Government were Roque Lopez, president; Vicente Franco, vice president and secretary of the interior; Venancio Concepcion, secretary of finance; Ramon Avanceňa, secretary of state; Jovito Yusay, secretary of justice; Julio Hernandez, secretary of war; Fernando Salas, secretary general. General Martin T. Delgado was chosen General –in-Chief of the Revolutionary Forces.

Santa Barbara became the headquarters of the Revolutionary Forces and from here, Gen. Delgado launched the campaign to liberate the whole province which culminated in the surrender of Iloilo City by Governor-General de los Rios on December 24, 1898.

The victory against Spain was short-lived as the Philippine–American War followed. Gen. Delgado led the same army against Americans from 1899 to 1901. Delgado was forced to surrender on February 2, 1901.

Upon the establishment of the civil government, Martin Delgado was appointed as the first provincial Governor of Iloilo and was elected to the same position in the first elections held in 1903. Santa Barbara became a town under American regime and was incorporated into a municipality by the Commonwealth Government. The town soon began to progress.

In 1948, Barangay Tuburan-Solbud was transferred to Zarraga, Iloilo.

Kaliwat sang Santa Barbara

Migration occurred in the 20th century to Mindanao in the 1940s under Manuel Roxas who was from Panay. Thousands migrated throughout the 1940s and 1950s as part of a resettlement movement sponsored by the government. Today, many Santa Barbaranon are now living in Mindanao, with a huge presence in:
Cities
Cotabato City
General Santos
Kidapawan City
Koronadal City, South Cotabato
Tacurong City, Sultan Kudarat
Municipalities
Banga, South Cotabato
Columbio, Sultan Kudarat
Esperanza, Sultan Kudarat
Isulan, Sultan Kudarat
Kabacan, Cotabato
Lake Sebu, South Cotabato
Midsayap, Cotabato
M’lang, Cotabato
Norala, South Cotabato
Pikit, Cotabato
Polomolok, South Cotabato
Santo Niño, South Cotabato
Surallah, South Cotabato
Tampakan, South Cotabato
Tantangan, South Cotabato
T’boli, South Cotabato
Tulunan, Cotabato
Tupi, South Cotabato

Demographics

The population of Santa Barbara speaks both Hiligaynon and Kinaray-a interchangeably. Tagalog and English are also spoken.

Economy 
Santa Barbara is one of the major municipalities with the highest income annually within Metro Iloilo, along with Pavia and Oton. It serves as the gateway to Iloilo City as it hosts the access road to Iloilo International Airport. The newly opened Wilcon Depot, SUVIL Town Center, SM Savemore, SM City Santa Barbara(Soon) etc. are among the large commercial establishments in the municipality. Santa Barbara Heights, a  mixed-use development, is currently being developed by Megaworld’s Global-Estate Resorts, Inc. The development consists of residential, commercial, and office buildings; an international school; residential villages; etc.

Several provincial and regional government offices are expected to be transferred to the new Iloilo Province Government Center in Barangay Bolong Oeste, including the Department of Health (DOH), Department of the Interior and Local Government (DILG), Office of Civil Defense (OCD), and PhilHealth, among others. The new government center will also house commercial areas such as BPOs and hotels. As a result, there has been a proposal to transfer the provincial capital from Iloilo City to Santa Barbara, a more strategic location for the whole province. This effort, according to the governor, is to speed up further development in the metropolitan area outside Iloilo City.

Transportation

In July 2007, the new Iloilo International Airport, located in Cabatuan and Santa Barbara, Iloilo was opened to the public. As a result, access to air transportation has significantly improved. Before, the plying of taxis in the municipality is an uncommon sight to most Santa Barbaranhon's but with the construction and operation of the New Iloilo Airport the town started progressing economically more and more every year.

In the past few years, there have been proposals for the revival of the defunct Panay Railways, which would include a train station in Santa Barbara. It will re-connect the town to Iloilo City, Roxas City, and Malay, Aklan.

Landmarks

Roman Catholic Church and Convent One of the better restored and preserved churches in the province, Santa Barbara Church is an excellent example of the Filipino baroque colonial architecture. It is a neoclassical church where General Martin T. Delgado of the Visayan Revolutionary Government convened the junta that raised the first of cry revolution against Spain in Iloilo. The church was dedicated to the towns patron saint, Santa Barbara last December 3, 2015. It was also declared as a National Historical Landmark in 1991, National Museum in 2015, and Philippine National Treasure also in 2015 because of the importance of the church and convent in the history of the Philippines.

Cry of Santa Barbara Marker This lies in the same site where the Filipino Flag was first raised outside Luzon. The event is now popularity known as Cry of Santa Barbara, one which recognizes the heroism and bravery of General Martin T. Delgado and his Liberating Army. This marker is the anchor of the Town's important role in the Philippine History.

Roman Catholic Cemetery One of the oldest landmarks in the town. Its facade bears the mark of the Spanish influence in the country and considered as one of the strongest structure in the town. It was constructed in 1845.

Catmon Tree A tree with thick, green foliage and distinctly big, white flowers, this is where the town was first named after. Standing alone at the front, left side of the Municipal Hall Building, the Catmon Tree is the only one of its kind that can be found in the town now.

Flagpole In front of the Municipal Hall building, stood a 120-feet flagpole amidst a well manicured mini-park. This was constructed in time with the 1998 Philippine Centennial Celebration and it flies the biggest Philippine Flag outside Luzon. This flag is one of the only five giant flags in the country.

Santa Barbara Plaza Victory plaza Nestled in the heart of the town and landscaped in time for the 1998 Philippine Centennial, this is considered as a favorite hang-out of young and old especially during afternoons and early evenings. It has two main historical features which include the Bandstand and the Rizal Monument. The Bandstand, an octagonal-shaped structure was constructed in 1925 and since then served as venue to various political gatherings and other social activities. Another prominent structure with historical value in the plaza is the monument of Dr. Jose Rizal and the Propagandist.
The Santa Barbara plaza is one of the finest, and most beautiful plazas in the Philippines. It is also where the Seat of the Republic of the Visayas was declared on November 17, 1898, headed by president Roque Lopez. The plaza was also the site where the first Philippine flag was raised outside Luzon on December 25, 1898, followed by the plaza libertad in Metro Iloilo also in the same date. The plaza was also declared as a Historical Landmark in 2015.

General Martin Delgado Monument A bronze statue, facing the Municipal Hall Building in the north-western entrance of the "Victory Plaza". The monument is a tribute to the town's most distinguished son and the greatest revolutionary hero Visayas has ever produced, Gen. Martin T. Delgado. The statue which was unveiled in time with the 1998 Centennial Celebration is an unfading memorial of the gallantry and patriotism of Gen. Delgado and his revolutionary forces.

Iloilo Golf and Country Club Carved on a 35 hectares of plain and rolling hills, the 18-hole golf course in Barangay San Sebastian claims an undisputed pre-eminence in golfing history. Asia's largest golfing publication "Golf Digest" called Santa Barbara Golf Course as the oldest course in the Philippines and one of the oldest courses in Asia. Built in 1907 by a group of British expatriates working on the Panay Railways system, it distinguishes itself from other clubs as not only a place for recreation but a historical landmark as well.

Centennial Museum and Convention Center Constructed in 1998 as part of the Centennial Freedom Trail Site Project of the Philippine Centennial Commission, the museum houses antiques, artifacts and photos which tells the story of Santa Barbara's proud historical heritage.

Santa Barbara Irrigation Dam Constructed in 1926, the irrigation dam is the first gravity irrigation system in the Visayas that has revolutionized farming. This is the oldest irrigation system in the country.

References

External links

 
 Santa Barbara, Iloilo
 [ Philippine Standard Geographic Code]
 Philippine Census Information
 Local Governance Performance Management System

Municipalities of Iloilo